Sludina is a rural locality (a village) in Yorgvinskoye Rural Settlement, Kudymkarsky District, Perm Krai, Russia. The population was 119 as of 2010.

Geography 
Sludina is located 23 km northeast of Kudymkar (the district's administrative centre) by road. Rodeva is the nearest rural locality.

References 

Rural localities in Kudymkarsky District